The 1993 Dutch TT was the seventh round of the 1993 Grand Prix motorcycle racing season. It took place on 26 June 1993 at the TT Circuit Assen located in Assen, Netherlands.

500 cc race report

Honda announces that Shinichi Itoh’s bike is fuel-injected not carburated, and that this is the first time it is being used. Wayne Rainey wants to use a ROC chassis instead of the factory one which was overstiff, but wasn’t allowed to.

Mick Doohan on pole where he had his accident the previous year.

Kevin Schwantz gets the start from Daryl Beattie and Doohan.

Beattie crashes out of third and Mat Mladin’s crashing bike in the same turn sends the marshalls running. Beattie walks away from it.

There’s a 3-way fight for 1st between Schwantz, Alex Barros and Doohan.

Barros crashes out of the lead, tumbling hard through the furrowed gravel, but is able to walk to the barriers. The way Barros was tossed up by the furrows in the gravel is a foreshadowing of Rainey at Misano.

Schwantz leads Doohan into the chicane on the last lap and Doohan tries a desperate pass, but Schwantz holds him off. Schwantz is now 28 points ahead of Rainey.

500 cc classification

250 cc classification

References

Dutch TT
Dutch
Tourist Trophy